Bolot Belikovich Tsybzhitov (born 23 November 1994 in Suduntuy, Agin-Buryat Okrug, Zabaykalsky Krai) is a Russian archer who participated at the 2010 Summer Youth Olympics in Singapore. He won the bronze medal in the boys' event, defeating the mixed team silver medallist Gregor Rajh of Slovenia in the bronze medal match.

References 

1994 births
Living people
People from Aginsky District
Buryat sportspeople
Russian male archers
Archers at the 2010 Summer Youth Olympics
Sportspeople from Zabaykalsky Krai
21st-century Russian people